Sedna Desgagnés is a Beluga E/F type cargo ship built in China from 2007 to 2009 and entered service with the Canadian shipping line Groupe Desgagnés in 2009.  The television series High Arctic Haulers followed the vessel as she made the annual deliveries of supplies to a series of communities in Canada's Arctic Archipelago, during the short shipping season. The vessel also sails on the Great Lakes and St. Lawrence Seaway and is in service.

Description
Designated a multi-purpose dry cargo ship by Groupe Desgagnés, Sedna Desgagnés is a Beluga E/F type vessel.

The ship is powered by a single MAK Caterpillar 6M43C diesel engine turning one shaft creating .

The vessel is rated as DNV-GL - 100A5 E3, equivalent to Lloyd's 100A1 Ice Class 1A.

Construction and career
The ship's keel was laid down on 16 November 2007 at Qingshan Shipyard in Wuhan, China with the yard number 20060304. The vessel was launched on 12 May 2008 and completed on 23 February 2009. When completed the vessel was named Beluga Festivity. That year, the vessel was renamed Sedna Desgagnés, registered in Quebec City, Quebec, Canada with the IMO number 9402093, call sign CYQE and MMSI number 314296000. The ship entered service in 2009. 

Sedna Desgagnés ran aground in the St. Lawrence Seaway, near Prescott, Ontario, on 14 October 2012. Carrying a cargo of pig iron, the cargo had to be shifted to a lighter before the vessel could be freed by two tugs on 20 October.

The television series High Arctic Haulers followed the vessel as she made the annual deliveries of supplies to a series of communities in Canada's Arctic Archipelago, during the short shipping season. 

In June 2021, Sedna Desgagnés performed the first voyage of a new container feeder service between the ports of Montreal, Quebec and Hamilton, Ontario.

Notes

Citations

References
 
 
 
 

Bulk carriers
Groupe Desgagnés
Merchant ships of Canada
2008 ships
Maritime incidents in 2012
Ships built in Wuhan